Daba is a town under the administration of Fuxin Mongol Autonomous County, Liaoning, China. , it has 12 villages under its administration:
Dudaiyingzi Village
Ermendeli Village
Daobudai Village
Banjieta Village
Chexin Village
Nuoriyingzi Village
Dongweizigou Village
Xiaodong Village
Yuanbaowa Village
Houchaoyang Village
Dongchaoyang Village
Zhuligachi Village

References 

Township-level divisions of Liaoning
Fuxin Mongol Autonomous County